|}
Matthew Thomas Bonson is a former Australian politician. He was a Labor member of the Northern Territory Legislative Assembly, representing the seat of Millner from 2001 to 2008. Prior to his election, he worked as a local solicitor. He was Minister for Sport and Recreation, Corporate and Information Services, Senior Territorians, Young Territorians and Minister Assisting the Chief Minister on Multicultural Affairs. His seat was abolished at the 2008 election and he was defeated by Dave Tollner for the new seat of Fong Lim.

References

Year of birth missing (living people)
Living people
Members of the Northern Territory Legislative Assembly
Australian Labor Party members of the Northern Territory Legislative Assembly
Indigenous Australian politicians
21st-century Australian politicians